The name Glenda has been used for eleven tropical cyclones worldwide: five in the Eastern Pacific Ocean; three in the Philippines by PAGASA in the Western Pacific Ocean; twice in the Australian region of the Southern Hemisphere; once in the South-West Indian Ocean.

In the Eastern Pacific:
 Hurricane Glenda (1963)
 Tropical Storm Glenda (1965)
 Hurricane Glenda (1969)
 Tropical Storm Glenda (1973)
 Tropical Storm Glenda (1977)

In the Philippines area:
 Typhoon Kaemi (2006) (T0605, 06W, Glenda) – struck Taiwan and China.
 Typhoon Kompasu (2010) (T1007, 08W, Glenda)
 Typhoon Rammasun (2014) (T1409, 09W, Glenda) – a Category 5 super typhoon that impacted the Philippines and China.

PAGASA retired the name after the 2014 storm and replaced it with Gardo.

In the Australian region:
 Cyclone Glenda (1967)
 Cyclone Glenda (2006) – Category 5 severe tropical cyclone that made landfall in Western Australia.

The name was retired from future use in the region after the 2006 storm.

In the South-West Indian:
 Severe Tropical Storm Glenda (2015)

Pacific hurricane set index articles
Pacific typhoon set index articles
Australian region cyclone set index articles
South-West Indian Ocean cyclone set index articles